Andriy Samiylovych Malyshko (born  in Obukhiv, Kyiv Governorate, Russian Empire - died 17 February 1970 in Kyiv, Ukrainian SSR of the Soviet Union) was a Soviet and Ukrainian poet, translator, literary critic, parliamentary. Many of his poems were made into songs for example: Рідна мати моя - При ватрі.

External links
 
 
 Andriy Malyshko in the Ukrainian Soviet Encyclopedia

1912 births
1970 deaths
People from Obukhiv
People from Kievsky Uyezd
Communist Party of the Soviet Union members
Third convocation members of the Verkhovna Rada of the Ukrainian Soviet Socialist Republic
Fourth convocation members of the Verkhovna Rada of the Ukrainian Soviet Socialist Republic
Ukrainian poets
Ukrainian translators
War correspondents of World War II
Soviet war correspondents
Stalin Prize winners
Recipients of the Shevchenko National Prize
Recipients of the USSR State Prize
Recipients of the Order of Lenin
Recipients of the Order of the Red Banner
Burials at Baikove Cemetery
20th-century translators
Soviet poets
Soviet translators